The 1938–39 William & Mary Indians men's basketball team represented the College of William & Mary in intercollegiate basketball during the 1938–39 season. Under the second year of head coach John Kellison's second stint with William & Mary, the team finished the season 9–12 and 4–9 in the Southern Conference. This was the 34th season of the collegiate basketball program at William & Mary, whose nickname is now the Tribe.

The Indians finished 12th in the conference and did not quality for the 1939 Southern Conference men's basketball tournament. However, the Indians did record their first ever conference victories during 1939.

Schedule

|-
!colspan=9 style="background:#006400; color:#FFD700;"| Regular season

Source

References

William & Mary Tribe men's basketball seasons
William and Mary Indians
William and Mary Indians Men's Basketball Team
William and Mary Indians Men's Basketball Team